Baodu Zhai, or Baodu Village, is an ancient fortified hilltop settlement located in the outlying Luquan District about  from central Shijiazhuang, Hebei, China. It is located on top of Baodu Mountain, which is said to resemble a reclining Buddha.

According to legend, the Han dynasty commander Han Xin ambushed 2000 soldiers at the site, and in the Wei dynasty, an uprising by Ge Rong forced local villagers to flee to the mountain carrying their calves, hence the name "Baodu" ("bao" means "to carry" and "du" means "calf").

The settlement is completely encircled by a fortified stone wall, much like Chengde Mountain Resort. The main entrance is Nantianmen. Inside the wall there are several important cultural sites, which have earned Baodu Zhai a national AAAA rating as a scenic spot, as well as a large area of vegetation and gardens. These sites include the Hall of 500 Luohan, which is a large underground chamber containing 500 carved stone luohan, each in a different pose, and presided over by three golden Buddhas.

Baodu Zhai can be accessed by a footpath leading up from the southeast, or a cable car with a middle station.

References

External links

Chinese architectural history
Buildings and structures in Hebei
Tourist attractions in Hebei
Shijiazhuang
AAAA-rated tourist attractions